The Iron Bridge at Howard Hill Road is a modern pony truss bridge, carrying Howard Hill Road across the Black River in southeastern Cavendish, Vermont.  It is a replacement for an historic 1890 Pratt through truss bridge, which is now in storage.  The historic bridge was listed on the National Register of Historic Places in 1982.

Modern bridge
The Howard Hill Road Bridge is located in southeastern Cavendish, just south of Vermont Route 131, which parallels the Black River on its northern bank.  The river is at that point flowing roughly eastward, and the bridge is oriented north-south on modern concrete footings.  The bridge is a low riveted pony truss structure, serving a few dead-end roads on the south side of the river.

Historic bridge
The historic bridge, in storage as of 2012, was a single-span Pratt through truss built out of wrought and cast iron with elements connected by pins. It was set on uncoursed fieldstone abutments.

The bridge was built in 1890 by the Groton Bridge Co., and is one of a small number of 19th-century pin-connected truss bridges in the state.  The bridge was dismantled in 2007, and is in storage held by the Historic Bridges Program of the state, which is seeking a suitable location to place it.

See also
National Register of Historic Places listings in Windsor County, Vermont
List of bridges on the National Register of Historic Places in Vermont

References

Road bridges on the National Register of Historic Places in Vermont
National Register of Historic Places in Windsor County, Vermont
Bridges completed in 1890
Buildings and structures in Cavendish, Vermont
Bridges in Windsor County, Vermont
Pratt truss bridges in the United States
Iron bridges in the United States